Revenge of the Pontianak, or Dendam Pontianak is a 2019 Singaporean Malay-language romantic horror film. In the film, a couple and a village is being terrorised by a beautiful Pontianak, who has arrived to take revenge on a guy she loves forever.

It is released on 29 August 2019 in Singapore; 12 September 2019 in Malaysia and Brunei.

Synopsis
It is 1965 in a village in Malaysia. Khalid and Siti, a couple is preparing for their wedding day with the help from the villagers. Soon after, the village suffers horrific deaths and supernatural happenings, causing fear and paranoia among the villagers. This is because, a female ghost: the beautiful Pontianak has arrived and terrorised the village. She is taking revenge on Khalid. How will their story go?

A pontianak is a female vampire ghost of a woman who had died during pregnancy or childbirth in the Southeast Asian folklore.

Cast
Nur Fazura - Mina
Remy Ishak - Khalid
Hisyam Hamid - Reza
Shenty Feliziana - Siti
Namron
Tony Eusoff - Rais
Nadiah M. Din
Nadia Aqilah
Nik Harraz Danish

Hasnah Hashim
Haslinna Jaaman
Wan Hanafi Su

References

External links

Revenge of the Pontianak on Cinemaonline.sg

Singaporean horror films
2019 films